Piz Rosatsch is a mountain in the Bernina Range of the Alps, overlooking St. Moritz in the canton of Graubünden. It lies on the range between the main Inn valley and the Val Roseg, north of Piz Corvatsch.

References

External links
 
 Piz Rosatsch on Hikr

Bernina Range
Mountains of Graubünden
Mountains of the Alps
Alpine three-thousanders
Mountains of Switzerland
St. Moritz